The 2013 Famous Idaho Potato Bowl was an American college football bowl game that was played on December 21, 2013 at Bronco Stadium on the campus of Boise State University in Boise, Idaho.  The seventeenth annual Famous Idaho Potato Bowl, it featured the Buffalo Bulls of the Mid-American Conference against the San Diego State Aztecs of the Mountain West Conference.  It began at 3:30 p.m. MST and aired on ESPN.  It was one of the 2013–14 bowl games that concluded the 2013 FBS football season.  San Diego State defeated Buffalo, 49–24.

Teams
The Bulls accepted their invitation after earning an 8–4 record in their season, while the Aztecs accepted their invitation after earning a 7–5 record in theirs.

Buffalo Bulls

The Bulls returned to their winning ways this season, finishing at 8–4 overall and 6–2 in conference play, good for second place in the MAC's East Division. At season's end, bowl director Kevin McDonald extended an invitation to the Bulls to play in the game.

This was Buffalo's first Famous Idaho Potato Bowl appearance. The University at Buffalo was led by Khalil Mack, who was the MAC Defensive Player of the Year, with team-high 94 tackles, 19 TFLs, 10.5 sacks, three interceptions and five forced fumbles. Buffalo has seven players named to All-MAC Teams, with five on the first team.

San Diego State Aztecs

The Aztecs continued their recent winning ways this season, finishing at 7–5 overall and 6–2 in conference play, good for second place in the Mountain West's West Division.  At season's end, bowl director Kevin McDonald extended an invitation to the Aztecs to play in the game.

This will be San Diego State's first Famous Idaho Potato Bowl, setting a school-record fourth consecutive bowl game. Quarterback Quinn Kaehler has thrown for 2,796 yards and 17 touchdowns for coach Rocky Long this season.

Game summary

Scoring summary

Statistics

Starting lineups
Source:

References

Famous Idaho Potato Bowl
Famous Idaho Potato Bowl
Buffalo Bulls football bowl games
San Diego State Aztecs football bowl games
December 2013 sports events in the United States
Famous Idaho Potato Bowl